Marcos Gabriel Berríos is a major in the United States Air Force and a NASA astronaut candidate.

Early life and education
Berríos was born in Fort Campbell, Tennessee, United States and raised in Guaynabo, Puerto Rico. He went to Antilles High School, in Fort Buchanan, Puerto Rico where he graduated. Holds a bachelor’s degree in mechanical engineering from the Massachusetts Institute of Technology and a master’s degree in mechanical engineering as well as a doctorate in Aeronautics and Astronautics from Stanford University.  Graduated from the United States Naval Test Pilot School at Naval Air Station Patuxent River, in Maryland.

Career
He began his operational flying career in 2011 in the California Air National Guard as a HH-60G Combat Search and Rescue (CSAR) helicopter pilot with the 129th Rescue Wing, Berríos worked as an aerospace engineer for the U.S. Army Aviation Development Directorate at Moffett Federal Airfield in California. A distinguished pilot, Berríos has accumulated more than 110 combat missions and 1,300 hours of flight time in more than 21 different aircraft. Served in the active duty United States Air Force in the War in Afghanistan (2001–2021) in search and rescue missions.

Astronaut candidacy
On December 6, 2021, he was revealed to be one of the 10 candidates selected in the 2021 NASA Astronaut Group 23. He will report for duty in January 2022.

References

Astronaut candidates
California National Guard personnel
Living people
MIT School of Engineering alumni
People from Guaynabo, Puerto Rico
Puerto Rican military officers
Puerto Rican United States Air Force personnel
Stanford University School of Engineering alumni
United States Air Force personnel of the War in Afghanistan (2001–2021)
United States Naval Test Pilot School alumni
1984 births